Rhythm Racketeer is a 1937 British musical film directed by James Seymour and starring Harry Roy, Princess Pearl and James Carew. It was made at Rock Studios, Elstree, by the independent producer Joe Rock.

Cast
 Harry Roy as Harry Grant and Napoleon Connors  
 Princess Pearl as Karen Vosper  
 James Carew as Clinton Vosper  
 Norma Varden as Della Nash  
 Johnny Hines as Nifty  
 Johnnie Schofield as Spike  
 Judith Wood as Lola  
 Georgie Harris as The Rat 
 Syd Crossley as Minor Role  
 George Merritt as Inspector Hunt  
 Charles Paton as Assistant In Chemist Shop 
 James Pirrie as Bugs Cole  
 Pamela Randall as Minor Role  
 Terry-Thomas as Extra

References

Bibliography
 Low, Rachael. Filmmaking in 1930s Britain. George Allen & Unwin, 1985.
 Wood, Linda. British Films, 1927-1938. British Film Institute, 1986.

External links

1937 films
British musical films
1937 musical films
1930s English-language films
Films shot at Rock Studios
British black-and-white films
1930s British films